New Sathorn International School (NSIS;) was a private PK-12 international school located in Yan Nawa District of Bangkok, Thailand, and is now permanently closed.

History
The school was founded by Dr. Chongik Rhee in 2004.

The NSIS Plan 
The NSIS Academic Curriculum provides an international education with a focus on global issues by engaging students from different cultures within the school. NSIS has students enrolled from more than thirty countries.

NSIS incorporates the American curriculum utilizing international best practices with consideration for Thai culture and wisdom while remaining outside of national systems. At its heart, NSIS, is a Christian school striving to encourage leadership for the 21st Century.

References

External links 

 
 New Sathorn International School (NSIS) homepage

International schools in Bangkok
American international schools in Thailand
British international schools in Thailand
Educational institutions established in 2004
2004 establishments in Thailand
Private schools in Thailand